Akani Pata, also known as Akani Kampu, is a Wayana village on the Tapanahony River in Suriname. The Apetina Airstrip lies in between Akani Pata and Apetina.

Notes

References 

Indigenous villages in Suriname
Populated places in Sipaliwini District